Senecio planiflorus is a species of the genus Senecio and family Asteraceae. It is endemic to Chile.

References

External links

planiflorus
Endemic flora of Chile